The Guelph Gryphons represented the University of Guelph in the 2009-10 Canadian Interuniversity Sport women's hockey season. The Gryphons attempted to win their first Canadian Interuniversity Sport women's ice hockey championship.  Their head coach was Rachel Flanagan, assisted by Kirsten Thatcher and John Lovell.

Offseason
 April 9: The Guelph Gryphon women's ice hockey team confirmed the addition of Mississauga native Jenna Lanzarotta. The forward participated with the Mississauga Jr. Chiefs in 2008-09. She amassed 21 points (9 goals, 12 assists) in 33 games played while helping her team to a 2008-09 provincial gold medal. She also participated in the Tier 2 girls Hockey ROPSSAA championship this year with her St. Marcellinus Spirit high school team. In addition, she was the hockey MVP for her high school.

Exhibition
 Two of the Gryphons exhibition games will involve NCAA teams.

Regular season
 The Gryphons ranked seventh in the inaugural women's hockey coaches poll of the 2009-2010 season.

Roster

Schedule

Tournaments
 Guelph participated in the Concordia Tournament from December 28–30.

Player stats

Skaters

Goaltenders

Postseason

CIS Tournament

References

External links
 Official site

University of Guelph
Guelph
Gue